Verconia protea is a species of colourful sea slug, a dorid nudibranch, a shell-less marine gastropod mollusk in the family Chromodorididae.

Distribution 
Known only from Oudekraal and Vulcan Rock on the Cape Peninsula west coast and Pinnacle dive site near Gordon's Bay on the east side of False Bay. South African endemic.

Description
A small (15mm) dorid with a smooth salmon pink body and white dotted margin.

Ecology
Often found on an encrusting sponge of almost identical colour at depths of 8 to 10m.

References

Chromodorididae
Gastropods described in 1994